Baron Hobhouse may refer to:

Arthur Hobhouse, 1st Baron Hobhouse (1819–1904), British judge
John Hobhouse, 1st Baron Broughton (1786-1869), British diarist and politician
John Hobhouse, Baron Hobhouse of Woodborough (1932–2004), British Law Lord

Extinct baronies in the Peerage of the United Kingdom
Noble titles created in 1885